Suillus granulatus is a pored mushroom of the genus Suillus in the family Suillaceae.  It is similar to the related S. luteus, but can be distinguished by its ringless stalk. Like S. luteus, it is an edible mushroom that often grows in a symbiosis (mycorrhiza) with pine. It has been commonly known as the weeping bolete, or the granulated bolete. Previously thought to exist in North America, that species has now been confirmed to be the rediscovered Suillus weaverae.

Taxonomy
Suillus granulatus was first described by Carl Linnaeus in 1753 as a species of Boletus. It was given its current name by French naturalist Henri François Anne de Roussel when he transferred it to Suillus in 1796. Suillus is an ancient term for fungi, and is derived from the word "swine". Granulatus means "grainy" and refers to the glandular dots on the upper part of the stem.
However, in some specimens the glandular dots may be inconspicuous and not darkening with age; thus the name S. lactifluus, "oozing milk" was formerly applied to this form as it is not notably characterized by glandular dots.

Description

The orange-brown, to brown-yellow cap is viscid (sticky) when wet, and shiny when dry, and is usually 4 to 12 cm in diameter. The stem is pale yellow, of uniform thickness, with tiny brownish granules at the apex, and about 4–8 tall, 1–2 cm wide. It is without a ring. The tubes and pores are small, pale yellow, and exude pale milky droplets when young. The flesh is also pale yellow.

Suillus granulatus is often confused with Suillus luteus, which is another common and widely distributed species occurring in the same habitat. S. luteus has conspicuous a partial veil and ring, and lacks the milky droplets on the pores.  
Also similar is Suillus brevipes, which has a short stipe in relation to the cap, and which does not ooze droplets from the pore surface. Suillus pungens is also similar.

Bioleaching 
Bioleaching is the industrial process of using living organisms to extract metals from ores, typically where there is only a trace amount of the metal to be extracted. It has been found that Suillus granulatus can extract trace elements (Titanium, Calcium, Potassium, Magnesium and Lead) from wood ash and apatite.

Distribution and habitat
Grows with Pinus (pine trees) on both calcareous and acid soils, and sometimes occurs in large numbers. Suillus granulatus is the most widespread pine-associating Suillus species in warm climates. It is common in Britain, Europe. It is associated with Japanese red pine (Pinus densiflora) in South Korea.
A native to the Northern Hemisphere, the fungus has been introduced into Australia under Pinus radiata. It is also found in Africa, New Zealand, Hawaii, Argentina and southern Chile.

Edibility
Suillus granulatus is edible and variously considered to be of either good or poor quality. The gelatinous pileipellis should be removed first, and like all Suillus species, the tubes are best removed before cooking. It has been reported to cause gastric upset in some cases. It is sometimes included in commercially produced mushroom preserves. The fruit bodies—low in fat, high in fiber and carbohydrates, and a source of nutraceutical compounds—can be considered a functional food.

Toxicity
Suillus granulatus sometimes causes contact dermatitis to those who handle it.

References
R.Phillips-Mushrooms 2006
Marcel Bonn-Mushrooms and Toadstools of Britain and North West Europe.

granulatus
Edible fungi
Fungi described in 1753
Fungi of Europe
Fungi of Africa
Fungi of Australia
Fungi native to Australia
Fungi of New Zealand
Fungi of North America
Fungi of South America
Taxa named by Carl Linnaeus
Fungi of Oceania
Fungi without expected TNC conservation status